Dangerous Crossroads is a 1933 American pre-Code action film directed by Lambert Hillyer and written by Lew Levenson. The film stars Charles "Chic" Sale, Diane Sinclair, Frank Albertson, Preston Foster, Jackie Searl and Niles Welch. The film was released on June 15, 1933, by Columbia Pictures.

Cast     
Charles "Chic" Sale as Rufe Marvin   
Diane Sinclair as Lois
Frank Albertson as Jimmy Blake
Preston Foster as Hinton
Jackie Searl as Jackie
Niles Welch as Curtis
Eddie Kane as Herb Jackson
Tom Forman as Lefty

References

External links
 

1933 films
American action films
1930s action films
Columbia Pictures films
Films directed by Lambert Hillyer
American black-and-white films
1930s English-language films
1930s American films